Fox Theatre or Fox Theater or Fox Theater Building may refer to:

U.S.
Fox Tucson Theatre (Tucson, Arizona)
Fox Theater (Bakersfield, California)
Fox Theatre (Fullerton, California)
Fox Theater, Westwood Village (Los Angeles, California)
Fox Oakland Theatre (Oakland, California)
Pomona Fox Theater (Pomona, California)
Fox Theatre (Redwood City, California)
Riverside Fox Theater (Riverside, California)
Fox California Theatre, now called the California Theatre (San Jose, California)
Fox Theatre (Visalia, California)
Fox Theatre, the original name of Copley Symphony Hall (San Diego, California)
Fox Theatre (San Francisco), California
Fox Theatre (Boulder, Colorado)
Fox Theater at Foxwoods Resort Casino (Ledyard, Connecticut)
Fox Theatre (Atlanta), Georgia
Blue Fox Theatre (Grangeville, Idaho)
Fox Theater (Hutchinson, Kansas)
Fox–Watson Theater Building (Salina, Kansas)
Fox Theatre (Detroit), Michigan
Fox Theater (Joplin, Missouri)
Fox Theatre (St. Louis), Missouri
 Fox Theatre (Las Cruces, New Mexico)
Fox Theatre (Portland, Oregon)
Fox Theater (Spokane, Washington)
Fox Theatre, the original name of Meyer Theatre (Green Bay, Wisconsin)
Fox Theater (Stevens Point, Wisconsin)

Canada 
Fox Theatre (Toronto)

See also 
Fox Theatres, a defunct chain of movie theaters

Lists of theatres